Crassispira hispaniolae is an extinct species of sea snail, a marine gastropod mollusk in the family Pseudomelatomidae, the turrids and allies.

Description
The length of the shell attains 9.5 mm, its diameter 3.25 mm.

Distribution
Fossils have been found in Pliocene strata of the Dominican Republic: age range: 5.332 to 3.6 Ma

References

 C. J. Maury. 1917. Santo Domingo type sections and fossils. Bulletins of American Paleontology 5(30):1-43

hispaniolae
Gastropods described in 1917